Bellevue Park may refer to any of the following:

United Kingdom
Bellevue Park, Wrexham, a park in Wrexham, Wales
Bellevue Park Railway, a railway formerly in operation in Belfast

United States
Bellevue Park (Harrisburg), a neighborhood in Harrisburg, Pennsylvania
Bellevue Hill Park, a park in Cincinnati, Ohio
Bellevue Downtown Park, a park in Bellevue, Washington
Bellevue Park (stadium), a stadium in Green Bay, Wisconsin, formerly used by the Green Bay Packers

See also
Bellevue State Park (disambiguation)
Belle Vue Park (disambiguation)